Daniel Dee Burnes (January 4, 1851 – November 2, 1899) was a U.S. Representative from Missouri.

Born in Ringgold, Missouri, Burnes received his early schooling in Weston, Missouri.
He graduated from St. Louis University, in St. Louis, Missouri, in 1873 and from the law department of Harvard University in 1874.
Later, he moved to Germany and studied at Heidelberg University.
He returned to the United States and settled in St. Joseph, Missouri, where he engaged in the practice of law.

Burnes was elected as a Democrat to the Fifty-third Congress (March 4, 1893 – March 3, 1895).
He declined to be a candidate for reelection in 1894, and resumed the practice of law.
He died on his estate, "Ayr Lawn," at St. Joseph, Buchanan County, Missouri, November 2, 1899.
He was interred in Mount Mora Cemetery.

References

1851 births
1899 deaths
Harvard Law School alumni
Democratic Party members of the United States House of Representatives from Missouri
19th-century American politicians
People from Platte County, Missouri